The Acquisition of Land Act 1967 (ALA) is an Act of the Parliament of Queensland. The ALA establishes authority for the Queensland Government to acquire land for specific purposes including the creation of roads, railways, and other essential infrastructure. The acquisition of land in this way is referred to in Australian legal jurisdictions as ‘compulsory acquisition’, known internationally as eminent domain. The ALA does not allow such acquisition for a private purpose, only by the State for one of the purposes specified.

The Coordinator General of Queensland is responsible for acquiring land for the completion of infrastructure projects. Any land or property can be acquired under the Act.

History 
Compulsory acquisition in Queensland was originally regulated by the Public Works Land Resumption Act 1906. The ALA inherits much of its substance from this legislation, particularly its compensation provisions.

Process 
The ALA provides for a variety of specific purposes under which land can be acquired. Examples include transportation, the environment, health, water, planning, and essential public infrastructure and services. The State of Queensland may acquire land for these specific reasons under the ALA, private acquisition is not provided for. Where the government plans to acquire land for a specific purpose, the owner is notified through a Notice of Intention to Resume. An owner can object, however if the relevant Minister is satisfied the acquisition is appropriate then their landholder right is converted to a right to claim compensation for loss of land. There is no possibility to appeal a decision of compulsory acquisition.

The acquisition of land under the ALA can be controversial. Moreton Bar Regional Council in 2020 sought to acquire privately owned land under the ALA in order to create a retarding basin.

Provisions

Part I - Preliminary 
Sets out an introduction of the Act, including definition of terms and its relationship with other acts. The part also deals with the Act's relationship with native title.

Part II - Taking of land 
Enables ‘constructing authorities’ to acquire land for public purposes. Sets out the processes by which this occurs, including with or without agreement of the title holder.

Part III - Discontinuance of taking of land 
The process by which a constructing authority can discontinue the resumption of land.

Part IV - Compensation 
Relates to a number of issues regarding compensation including:

 Who can claim compensation
 Assessment of compensation
 Costs, interest, mortgages, and rent
 Taxes, rates and charges

Amendments

Acquisition of Land and Other Legislation Amendment Act 2008 
This amendment, passed in 2009, made numerous and substantive changes to the ALA. It codified the need for a body corporate to be served with appropriate notice if common property is to be acquired. This amendment also introduced a requirement to provide advice of rights to compensation.

References

Bibliography 
Academic literature

Legal cases

Queensland legislation